Atrium Health University City is a 130-bed acute care facility  located in Charlotte's University City area. This hospital is the location of the second busiest emergency departments in Mecklenburg County. It is owned by Atrium Health, one of the nation's largest publicly owned, not-for-profit hospital operators. It originally operated under University Hospital before changing names to Carolinas Medical Center-University, Carolinas HealthCare System University, and finally to Atrium Health University City.

References

Atrium Health
Hospitals in Charlotte, North Carolina
Hospitals in North Carolina